Friedrich Eduard Beneke (17 February 1798 – c. 1 March 1854) was a German psychologist and post-Kantian philosopher.

Life 
Beneke was born in Berlin. He studied at the universities of Halle and Berlin, and served as a volunteer in the War of 1815.  After studying theology under Schleiermacher and de Wette, he turned to pure philosophy, studying English writers and the German modifiers of Kantianism, such as Jacobi, Fries and Schopenhauer. In 1820, he published Erkenntnisslehre, Erfahrungsseelenlehre als Grundlage alles Wissens, and his inaugural dissertation De Veris Philosophiae Initiis. His marked opposition to the philosophy of Hegel, then dominant in Berlin, was shown more clearly in the short tract, Neue Grundlegung zur Metaphysik (1822), intended to be the programme for his lectures as Privatdozent, and in the able treatise, Grundlegung zur Physik der Sitten (1822), written, in direct antagonism to Kant's Metaphysics of Morals, to deduce ethical principles from a basis of empirical feeling. In 1822 his lectures were prohibited in Berlin, because of the influence of Hegel with the Prussian authorities, who also prevented him from obtaining a chair from the Saxon government. He retired to Göttingen, lectured there for several years, and was then allowed to return to Berlin. In 1832 he received an appointment as professor extraordinarius at the university, which he continued to hold till his death. On 1 March 1854 he disappeared, and more than two years later his remains were found in the canal near Charlottenburg. There was some suspicion that he had committed suicide in a fit of mental depression.

Work in psychology 
The distinctive features of Beneke's system are the firmness with which he maintained that in empirical psychology is to be found the basis of all philosophy, and his rigid treatment of mental phenomena by the genetic method. According to Beneke, the perfected mind is a development from simple elements, and the first problem of philosophy is the determination of these elements and of the processes by which the development takes place. In his Neue Psychologie (essays iii., viii. and ix.), he defined his position with regard to his predecessors and contemporaries. This and the introduction to his Lehrbuch signaled the two great stages in tile progress of psychology the negation of innate ideas by John Locke, and of faculties, in the ordinary acceptation of the term, by Herbart. The next step was his own; he insisted that psychology must be treated as one of the natural sciences. As is the case with them, its content is given by experience alone, and differs from theirs only in being the object of the internal as opposed to the external sense. But by this Beneke in no wise meant a psychology founded on physiology. These two sciences, in his opinion, had quite distinct provinces and gave no mutual assistance. Just as little help is to be expected from the science of the body as from mathematics and metaphysics, both of which had been pressed by Herbart into the service of psychology. The true method of study is that applied with so much success in the physical sciences: critical examination of the given experience, and reference of it to ultimate causes, which may not be perceived, but are nevertheless hypotheses necessary to account for the facts. (See on method, Neue Psych., essay i.)

Starting from the two assumptions that there is nothing, or at least no formed product, innate in the mind, and that definite faculties do not originally exist, and from the fact that our minds nevertheless actually have a definite content and definite modes of action, Beneke proceeds to state somewhat dogmatically his scientifically verifiable hypotheses as to the primitive condition of the soul and the laws according to which it develops. Originally the soul is possessed of or is an immense variety of powers, faculties or forces (conceptions which Beneke, in opposition to Herbart, holds to be metaphysically justifiable), differing from one another only in tenacity, vivacity, receptivity and grouping. These primitive immaterial forces, so closely united as to form but one being (essence), acquire definiteness or form through the action upon them of stimuli or excitants from the outer world. This action of external impressions which are appropriated by the internal powers is the first fundamental process in the genesis of the completed mind. If the union of impression and faculty be sufficiently strong, consciousness (not self-consciousness) arises, and definite sensations and perceptions begin to be formed. These primitive sensations, however, are not to be identified with the special senses, for each of these senses is a system of many powers which have grown into a definite unity, have been educated by experience. From ordinary experience it must be concluded that a second fundamental process is incessantly going on: the formation of new powers, which takes place principally during sleep. The third and most important process results from the fact that the combination between stimulus and power may be weak or strong; if weak, then tile two elements are said to be movable, and they may flow over from one to another of the already formed psychical products. Any formed faculty does not cease to exist on the removal of its stimulus; in virtue of its fundamental property, tenacity, it sinks back as a trace (Spur) into unconsciousness, whence it may be recalled by the application to it of another stimulus, or by the attraction towards it of some of the movable elements or newly formed original powers. These traces and the flowing over of the movable elements are the most important conceptions in Beneke's psychology. Through them he gives a rationale of reproduction and association, and strives to show that all the formed faculties are simply developments from traces of earlier processes. Lastly, similar forms, according to the degree of their similarity, attract one another or tend to form closer combinations.

All psychical phenomena are explicable by the relation of impression and power, and by the flow of movable elements; the whole process of mental development is nothing but the result of the action and interaction of the above simple laws. In general this growth may be said to take the direction of rendering more and more definite by repetition and attraction of like to like tile originally indefinite activities of the primary faculties. Thus, the sensations of the special senses are gradually formed from the primary sensuous feelings (sensliche Empfindungen); concepts are formed from intuitions of individuals by the attraction of the common elements, and the consequent flow towards them of movable forms. Judgment is the springing into consciousness of a concept alongside of an intuition, or of a higher concept alongside of a lower. Reasoning is merely a more complex judgment. Nor are there special faculties of judging or reasoning. The understanding is simply the mass of concepts lying in the background of unconsciousness, ready to be called up and to flow with force towards anything closely connected with them. Even memory is not a special faculty; it is simply the fundamental property of tenacity possessed by the original faculties. The very distinction between the three great classes, knowledge, feeling and will, may be referred to elementary differences in the original relations of faculty and impression.

This is the groundwork of Beneke's philosophy. It should be compared with the association psychology of modern British thinkers, most of whose results and processes wiil be found worked into a comprehensive system in Beneke's work. In logic, metaphysics and ethics, Beneke's speculations are naturally dependent on his psychology.

The special value of Beneke's works is found in the many specimens of acute psychological analysis scattered throughout them. As a complete explanation of psychical facts, the theory seems defective. The original hypotheses, peculiar to Beneke, on which the whole depends, are hastily assumed and rest on a clumsy mechanical metaphor. As is the case with all empirical theories of mental development, the higher categories or notions, which are apparently shown to result from the simple elements, are really presupposed at every step. Particularly unsatisfactory is the account of consciousness, which is said to arise from the union of impression and faculty. The necessity of consciousness for any mental action whatsoever is apparently granted, but the conditions involved in it are never discussed or mentioned. The same defect appears in the account of ethical judgment; no amount of empirical fact can ever yield the notion of absolute duty. His results have found acceptance mainly with practical teachers. Undoubtedly his minute analysis of temperament and careful exposition of the means whereby the young, unformed mind may be trained are of infinite value; but the truth of many of his doctrines on these points lends no support to the fundamental hypotheses, from which, indeed, they might be almost entirely severed.

Influence and school
German writers who, though not professed followers of Beneke, were influenced by him, include Friedrich Ueberweg and Karl Fortlage. In Britain, the only writer who showed acquaintance with his works is J. D. Morell (Introduction to Mental Philosophy).

The compendium by the last-named author passed through four editions in Germany, and has been translated into French, Flemish and English. The English translation, Elements of Psychology (1871), gives a lucid and succinct view of the whole system.

Bibliography 
Beneke was a prolific writer, and besides the works mentioned above, published large treatises in several departments of philosophy, both pure and as applied to education and ordinary life. A complete list of his writings will be found in the appendix to Dressier's edition of the Lehrbuch der Psychologie als Naturwissenschaft (1861). The chief ones are:

Psychologische Skizzen (1825, 1827)
Lehrbuch der Psychologie (1832)
Metaphysik und Religionsphilosophie (1840)
Die neue Psychologie (1845)
Pragmatische Psychologie oder Seelenlehre in der Anwendung auf das Leben (1832).

Notes

1798 births
1854 deaths
19th-century essayists
19th-century German male writers
19th-century German writers
19th-century German philosophers
Action theorists
German consciousness researchers and theorists
Continental philosophers
Empiricists
Epistemologists
German ethicists
German male essayists
German military personnel of the Napoleonic Wars
Humboldt University of Berlin alumni
Metaphysicians
Ontologists
People from the Margraviate of Brandenburg
Philosophers of mathematics
Philosophers of mind
Philosophers of psychology
Philosophers of religion
Writers from Berlin
1850s suicides
Suicides by drowning in Germany